Team America: World Police is a 2004 adult puppet comedy film directed by Trey Parker from a screenplay co-written with Matt Stone and Pam Brady. Parker and Stone also star, alongside Kristen Miller, Masasa Moyo, Daran Norris, Phil Hendrie, Maurice LaMarche, Chelsea Marguerite, Jeremy Shada and Fred Tatasciore. The film satirizes action film archetypes, American militarism, and the global implications of the politics of the United States. It follows the titular paramilitary police force, who recruit a Broadway actor to assist in saving the world from Kim Jong-il and his conspiracy of Islamic terrorists and liberal Hollywood actors.

Team America: World Police intertwines puppetry and miniature effects in a manner similar to Gerry Anderson's Supermarionation, known for its use in the TV series Thunderbirds, although Stone and Parker were not fans of that show. The duo worked on the script with former South Park writer Brady for nearly two years. The film had a troubled production, with assorted technical problems regarding the puppets and the scheduling extremes of finishing on time. The crew came into routine conflict with the Motion Picture Association of America, which returned the film multiple times with an NC-17 rating due to an explicit sex scene involving puppets.

Team America: World Police premiered at the Denver Film Festival on October 14, 2004, and was released theatrically in the United States on the following date by Paramount Pictures. It has received mostly positive reviews and grossed over $51 million worldwide on a $32 million budget.

Plot 
Team America, a paramilitary counterterrorist police force, eliminates a gang of terrorists in Paris, accidentally destroying the Eiffel Tower, Arc de Triomphe, and the Louvre in the process. The team includes Lisa, an idealistic psychologist; her love interest Carson; Sarah, a psychic; Joe, a jock who is in love with Sarah; and Chris, a martial arts expert who harbors a phobia towards actors. Carson proposes to Lisa, but a terrorist shoots him dead as he is doing it.

Team America leader Spottswoode brings Broadway actor Gary Johnston to Team America's base in Mount Rushmore and asks him to use his acting skills to infiltrate a terrorist cell. Unbeknownst to the team, North Korean dictator and terrorist mastermind Kim Jong-il is supplying international terrorists with weapons of mass destruction. Gary infiltrates a terrorist group in Cairo. The team is discovered and a chase ensues, with the team killing the terrorists. However, the city is left in ruins, drawing criticism from the Film Actors Guild (often shown as "F.A.G." in the film), a union of liberal Hollywood actors led by Alec Baldwin.

At the base Gary tells Lisa that as a child his acting talent caused his brother to be savagely killed by gorillas. While the two grow close and have sex, terrorists blow up the Panama Canal in retaliation for the Cairo operation. The Film Actors Guild blame this on Team America, as well as Kim chastising the terrorists for detonating one bomb too early. Gary, feeling his acting talents have again resulted in innocent people dying, resigns from Team America. The remaining members depart for the Middle East, but are defeated and captured by North Korean forces while Michael Moore blows up Team America's base in a suicide attack. In North Korea, Kim invites the Film Actors Guild and world leaders to a peace ceremony, planning to detonate a series of bombs around the globe while they are distracted.

Succumbing to depression, Gary is reminded of his responsibility by a speech from a drunken tramp, stating that "dicks" are necessary to save "pussies" from "assholes". Returning to the team's base, he finds Spottswoode has survived Moore's bombing. After regaining Spottswoode's trust by giving him a blowjob and undergoing one-day training, Gary goes to North Korea, where he uses his acting skills to infiltrate the base and free the team, although Lisa is held hostage by Kim. The team is confronted by the Film Actors Guild and kill most of the actors in their ensuing fight. After Gary uses his acting skills to save Chris from Susan Sarandon, Chris confesses to Gary that the reason he dislikes actors is because he was gang-raped by the cast of the musical Cats when he was 19 years old.

The team crash the peace ceremony and Gary goes on stage where he convinces the world's leaders to unite, using the tramp's speech. Alec Baldwin cannot counter Gary's arguments, so Kim betrays and kills Baldwin, but is kicked over a balcony by Lisa and impaled on a Pickelhaube. Kim reveals his true form as an enormous extraterrestrial cockroach and flees in a spaceship, promising to return. Gary and Lisa happily begin a relationship and the team reunites, preparing to fight the world's terrorists once again.

Cast 
 Trey Parker as Gary Johnston / Joe Smith / Carson / Kim Jong-il / Hans Blix / Matt Damon / Tim Robbins / Sean Penn / Michael Moore / Helen Hunt / Peter Jennings / Susan Sarandon / Drunk in Bar / Liv Tyler / Janeane Garofalo
 Matt Stone as Chris Roth / George Clooney / Danny Glover / Ethan Hawke / Martin Sheen
 Kristen Miller as Lisa Jones
 Masasa Moyo as Sarah Wong
 Daran Norris as Spottswoode
 Phil Hendrie as I.N.T.E.L.L.I.G.E.N.C.E. / Chechen terrorist
 Maurice LaMarche as Alec Baldwin
 Chelsea Marguerite as a French mother
 Jeremy Shada as Jean Francois
 Fred Tatasciore as Samuel L. Jackson
 Greg Ballora, Scott Land, and Tony Urbano as Lead puppeteers

The film also features a man dressed as a giant statue of Kim Il-sung, two black cats who pose as panthers, two nurse sharks, and a cockroach, with the difference in size with the marionettes played for humorous effect. A poster of the Barbi Twins was featured on the billboard in Times Square, making the Twins the only non-marionette humans in the film.

Production

Development 
The film's origins involve Parker and Stone watching Gerry and Sylvia Anderson's Thunderbirds on television while bored. Parker found that the series was unable to hold his interest as a child because "the dialogue was so expository and slow, and it took itself really seriously". The duo inquired about the rights to the series and found out that Universal Studios was doing a Thunderbirds film directed by Jonathan Frakes. "We said, 'What? Jonathan Frakes is directing puppets?' and then we found out it was a live-action version, and we were disappointed," said Parker.

News broke of the duo signing on to create the film on October 17, 2002, with Stone revealing that it would be a homage to Anderson. The news was confirmed in June 2003, with Variety quoting Stone as saying "What we wanted was to do a send-up of these super important huge action movies that Jerry Bruckheimer makes."

Before production began, Team America was championed at Paramount Pictures by Scott Rudin, who had been the executive producer for Parker and Stone's previous film, South Park: Bigger, Longer & Uncut. After the "hassle" of producing the South Park film, Parker and Stone had vowed never to create another movie. Other studio executives were initially unenthusiastic about the project: the studio was in favor of the film's lack of political correctness, but were confused by the use of puppets. The executives explained that they could not make profit from an R-rated puppet feature, and Parker countered that similar things had been said about the South Park film, an R-rated animated musical which had become a box-office hit. Tom Freston, who was co-president of Viacom, Paramount's parent company, also supported the film, feeling that Paramount should make more lower-budget films that appeal to children and young adults after the studio's failures with adult-oriented films such as The Stepford Wives. According to Parker and Stone, executives were finally won over after they saw the dailies from the film's production.

Writing 
Parker, Stone, and longtime writing partner Pam Brady spent nearly two years perfecting the Team America script. For influences, they studied scores of popular action and disaster films, such as Alien, Top Gun, and S.W.A.T. The duo watched Pearl Harbor to get the nuances of the puppets just right when they were staring at each other, and also used Ben Affleck as a model. To help shape the film's archetypal heroes (from the true believer to the reluctant hero to the guy who sells out his friends for greater glory), they read the books of Joseph Campbell. "On one level, it's a big send-up," Brady said. "But on another, it's about foreign policy". The first draft of the script was turned in well before the Iraq War. The film takes aim at various celebrities, many of whom came out in opposition to the Iraq War in 2003. Brady explained that the film's treatment of celebrities was derived from her annoyance at the screen time given to celebrities in the beginning of the Iraq War, in lieu of foreign policy experts.

Filming 
The film's central concept was easier to conceive than to execute. Team America was produced using a crew of about 200 people, which sometimes required four people at a time to manipulate a marionette. The duo were forced to constantly rewrite the film during production due to the limited nature of the puppets. The 270 puppet characters were created by the Chiodo Brothers, who previously designed puppets for films such as Elf and Dinosaur. The costumers of the crew were responsible for making sure the over 1,000 costumes remained in cohesive order and were realistic.

Production began on May 23, 2004. The project was interrupted multiple times early on in production. As soon as filming began, Parker and Stone labored to find the right comic tone; the original script for the film contained many more jokes. After shooting the very first scene, the two realized the jokes were not working, and that the humor instead came from the marionettes. "Puppets doing jokes is not funny," Stone found. "But when you see puppets doing melodrama, spitting up blood and talking about how they were raped as children, that's funny." Filming was done by three units shooting different parts at the same time. Occasionally, the producers had up to five cameras set up to capture the scene. The film was mainly based on the 1982 cult classic action film Megaforce, of which Parker and Stone had been fans. Many ideas had been copied such as the flying motorcycle sequence.

The film was painstakingly made realistic, which led to various shots being re-done throughout the process due to Parker and Stone's obsession with detail and craftsmanship. For example, a tiny Uzi cost $1,000 to construct, and Kim Jong-il's eyeglasses were made with hand-ground prescription lenses. Although the filmmakers hired three dozen marionette operators, simple performances from the marionettes were nearly impossible; a simple shot such as a character drinking might take a half-day to complete successfully. Parker and Stone agreed during production of Team America that it was "the hardest thing [they'd] ever done."

Rather than rely on computer-generated special effects added in post-production, the filmmakers vied to capture every stunt live on film. Parker likened each shot to a complicated math problem. The late September 2004 deadline for the film's completion took a toll on both filmmakers, as did various difficulties in working with puppets, with Stone, who described the film as "the worst time of [my] life," resorting to coffee to work 20-hour days, and sleeping pills to go to bed. The film was barely completed in time for its October 15 release date. At a press junket in Los Angeles on October 5, journalists were only shown a 20-minute reel of highlights because there was no finished print. Many of the film's producers had not seen the entire film with the sound mix until the premiere.

Editing 

Even before the scene's submission to the Motion Picture Association of America, Parker planned to "have fun" pushing the limits by throwing in the graphic sex scene. The duo knew the racy film would be met with some opposition, but were outraged when the film came back with their harshest rating, NC-17. The original cut's minute-and-a-half sex scene with Gary and Lisa was cut down to 50 seconds. The original scene also featured the two puppets urinating and defecating on one another, which was based on what children do humorously with dolls such as Barbie and Ken. At least nine edits of the puppet love scene were shown to the MPAA before the board accepted that it had been toned down enough to qualify for an R rating. Parker contrasted the MPAA's reluctance for the sex scene to their acceptance of the violence: "Meanwhile, we're taking other puppets and, you know, blowing their heads off, they're covered with blood and stuff, and the MPAA didn't have a word to say about that." In addition to the sex scene, the MPAA also objected to the scene in which the Hans Blix puppet is eaten by sharks. Stone and Parker had faced a similar conflict with their previous film South Park: Bigger, Longer & Uncut in 1999.

Music 

The film's score was composed by Harry Gregson-Williams. The soundtrack also contains "Magic Carpet Ride" performed by Steppenwolf, "Battle Without Honor or Humanity" performed by Tomoyasu Hotei, "Forbidden Bitter-Melon Dance" performed by Jeff Faustman, "Bu Dünyada Aşkından Ölmek" performed by Kubat, and songs by Trey Parker including "Everyone Has AIDS", "Freedom Isn't Free", "America, Fuck Yeah", "America, Fuck Yeah (Bummer Remix)", "Derka Derk (Terrorist Theme)", "Only a Woman", "I'm So Ronery", "The End of an Act", "Montage" , "You Are Worthless Alec Baldwin" and "North Korean Melody".

Individuals parodied in the film 
Famous people depicted as puppets, and lampooned, in the film include Michael Moore, Alec Baldwin, Sean Penn, Tim Robbins, Helen Hunt, George Clooney, Liv Tyler, Martin Sheen, Susan Sarandon, Janeane Garofalo, Matt Damon, Samuel L. Jackson, Danny Glover, Ethan Hawke, Kim Jong-il, Muammar Gaddafi, Tony Blair, Queen Elizabeth II, Sultan Qaboos, Fidel Castro, Peter Jennings and Hans Blix. Almost all of them are killed in gory and violent ways.

Reactions from those parodied were mixed; Baldwin found the project "so funny", and expressed interest in lending his voice to his character.  In a 2008 video interview with Time, Baldwin related how his daughter's classmates would recite Kim Jong-il's line to him, " Sean Penn, who is portrayed making outlandish claims about how happy and utopian Iraq was before Team America showed up, sent Parker and Stone an angry letter inviting them to tour Iraq with him, ending with the words "fuck you".

Both George Clooney and Matt Damon are said to be friends with Stone and Parker, and Clooney has stated that he would have been insulted had he not been included in the film. Damon is portrayed as a simpleton who can only say his own name. When asked about the film in 2016, Damon stated that he was confused by the portrayal, given that he was already known as both "a screenwriter and an actor":

Stone and Parker had earlier stated in an interview that they were inspired to give the Damon character that personality only after seeing the puppet that was made for him, which "looked kind of mentally deficient".

Kim Jong-il, a noted film buff, never commented publicly about his depiction in Team America: World Police, although shortly after its release North Korea asked the Czech Republic to ban the film; the country refused, saying that North Koreans had been rebuffed in their effort to undermine the Czech Republic's post-Communist-era freedom. The filmmakers acknowledged this in a DVD extra and jokingly suggested he sings "I'm So Ronery". Michael Moore is depicted as a fat, hot dog-eating glutton who partakes in suicide bombing and is referred to as a "giant socialist weasel" by I.N.T.E.L.L.I.G.E.N.C.E. Stone explained the reason for this portrayal in an MSNBC interview:  A deleted scene also shows Meryl Streep and Ben Affleck (who is portrayed with a real-life hand replacing his head).

Release 
The world premiere of Team America: World Police took place on October 11, 2004 in Hollywood, California. The United States premiere was on October 14, 2004 at the Denver Film Festival. Paramount Pictures released the film in the United States on October 15, 2004.

Home media 
The film was released on DVD and VHS in the United States on May 17, 2005 by Paramount Home Entertainment, available in both R-rated and unrated versions. The film was released on Blu-ray Disc on August 1, 2017 in the United States.

Reception

Critical response 
On Rotten Tomatoes, Team America: World Police has a 77% approval rating based on 198 reviews and an average score of 7.00/10. The site's consensus states, "Team America will either offend you or leave you in stitches. It'll probably do both." On Metacritic the film has a score of 64 out of 100 based on reviews from 38 critics, indicating "generally favorable reviews". Audiences surveyed by CinemaScore gave the film a "B" grade on an A+-to-F scale.

Peter Travers of Rolling Stone praised the film calling it "A ruthlessly clever musical, a punchy political parody and the hottest look ever at naked puppets."
Kirk Honeycutt of The Hollywood Reporter wrote: "Team America: World Police is to political commentary what lap dancing is to ballet. There is no room for subtlety. Aiming a rude, foul-mouthed political satire everywhere -- left, right and center -- Trey Parker and Matt Stone blow up a good deal of the world, not to mention the egos of many Hollywood personalities."
Brian Lowry of Variety was positive about the satire, saying the film "goes the extra mile to piss off everybody — which includes gleefully destroying renowned Hollywood liberals, literally and figuratively" but less positive about other aspects of the film: "All told, the clever visual bits and hilarious songs don't entirely compensate for the many flat or beyond-over-the-top spells." Lowry praised the songs saying they "deliver the movie's biggest highlights" and he also praised the production design calling it a "true technical achievement, recreating a dizzying array of sets and costumes at one-third scale and clearly having plenty of fun doing so — down to using housecats as stand-ins for terrifying panthers."
Richard Corliss of Time also highlighted the production "The real kick, however, is in the grandeur and detail of the production design, by Jim Dultz and David Rockwell."

Kim Newman of Empire magazine called it "a patchy comedy that's stronger as a genre-mocker than a political satire."
Roger Ebert gave the film 1 out of 4 stars and wrote: "I wasn't offended by the movie's content so much as by its nihilism", and was critical of the film's "sneer at both sides" approach, comparing it to "a cocky teenager who's had a couple of drinks before the party, they don't have a plan for who they want to offend, only an intention to be as offensive as possible."

Contemporary and retrospective comment on the film has observed that it takes aim at militarism in the United States, and Hollywood liberals' response. David Edelstein, in a review for Slate, wrote "the movie is a stink bomb lobbed at American arrogance and overweening militarism." In The Village Voice, Michael Atkinson wrote "Madly Rorschachian, TAWP appears to rub its shitty boots on U.S. militarism as well as Hollywood liberals".

National Review Online has named the film #24 in its list of "The Best Conservative Movies". Brian C. Anderson wrote, "the film's utter disgust with air-headed, left-wing celebrity activism remains unmatched in popular culture." Political and social commentator Andrew Sullivan considers the film brilliant in its skewering of both the left and right's approach on terrorism. Sullivan (a fan of Stone and Parker's other work, as well) popularized the term "South Park Republican" to describe himself and other like-minded fiscal conservatives/social libertarians. Parker himself is a registered Libertarian. Before the film's release, it was criticized by Matt Drudge and conservative group Move America Forward for mocking the War on Terror.

Before Team America was released, statements were released by a "senior Bush administration official" condemning the film. Upon receiving the news, the duo called and found it was instead a "junior staffer," causing Stone to quip "What is it – junior or senior? What are we talking about here? Who knows? It might have been the janitor." The two eventually decided it was free publicity, with which they were fine. Some media outlets interpreted the film's release on October 15 to be in theaters before the November elections. Parker said the release date had nothing to do with the elections, and the date was pushed back as far as possible due to production delays, but they had to return to South Park by October 20. 
Thunderbirds creator Gerry Anderson was supposed to have met Parker before production, but they cancelled the meeting, acknowledging he would not like the film's expletives. Anderson saw the completed film and felt "there are good, fun parts [in the film] but the language wasn't to my liking."

Box office 
Team America earned $12,120,358 in its opening U.S. weekend, ranking number three behind Shark Tale and Friday Night Lights. The film eventually grossed a total of $50,946,640, with $32,886,074 in U.S. domestic receipts and $18,160,566 in international proceeds.

Filmmakers' response 
In an interview with Matt Stone following the film's release, Anwar Brett of the BBC asked, "For all the targets you choose to take pot-shots at, George W. Bush isn't one of them. How come?" Stone replied, "If you want to see Bush-bashing in America you only have to walk about 10 feet to find it. Trey and I are always attracted to what other people aren't doing. Frankly that wasn't the movie we wanted to make." In another interview, Parker and Stone further clarified the end of the film which seems to try to justify the role of the United States as the "World Police":

Awards 

In a worldwide survey of comedians by The Guardian, the film was ranked seventh on a list of the fifty funniest films. In 2010, The Guardian listed the film as the 4th greatest comedy film of all time. In 2019, The Guardian ranked the film tenth on its list of 100 best films of the 21st century. Director Quentin Tarantino counted Team America: World Police in his list of top 20 films released since 1992, when his career as a filmmaker began, and director Edgar Wright named it as one of his 1,000 favorite films.

Soundtrack 
The film's soundtrack was released on October 19, 2004, and on CD on January 10, 2005, by Atlantic Records.

All songs are written and performed by Trey Parker, except where indicated.

Featured songs not included in the soundtrack:

Legacy 
In the aftermath of the December 2014 terrorism threats by Guardians of Peace on showings of the film The Interview, which resulted in Sony Pictures pulling the film from release, several theatres, including Alamo Drafthouse Cinema in Austin, Texas, protested the loss by scheduling free showings of Team America: World Police. However, Paramount pulled distribution of Team America from theaters, including those in Cleveland, Atlanta, and New Orleans. This action was seen by President Barack Obama as an attack on freedom of speech by Hollywood studios, and others as an act of pure cowardice. Snippets of the film mocking Kim Jong-il were reportedly set to be included, alongside copies of The Interview, in helium-filled balloons launched by North Korean defectors into their home country in an effort to inspire education on the Western world's views on it.

See also
 List of live-action puppet films

References 

 Moriarty Visits Matt & Trey On The Team America Set! – set report from AintItCool.com
 Team America: World Police – synopsis, clips and images from LatinoReview.com
 (October 2004). Play: South Park's Puppet Regime. Wired 12.10. Retrieved October 6, 2004.
 BBC Interview with Matt Stone
 Team America – Guy In Bar Philosophy by composer M.Regtien

Further reading

External links 

 
 
 

2000s adventure comedy films
2004 black comedy films
2000s parody films
2000s satirical films
2004 films
American action comedy films
American adventure comedy films
American aviation films
American black comedy films
American parody films
American political satire films
Cultural depictions of Alec Baldwin
Cultural depictions of Michael Moore
Cultural depictions of Kim Jong-il
Films about terrorism
Films directed by Trey Parker
Puppet films
Films produced by Scott Rudin
Films scored by Harry Gregson-Williams
Films set in Egypt
Films set in New York City
Films set in North Korea
Films set in Panama
Films set in Paris
Films set in South Dakota
Films set in Washington, D.C.
Films set in a fictional country
Films with screenplays by Pam Brady
HIV/AIDS in American films
Marionette films
Paramount Pictures films
Works by Trey Parker and Matt Stone
2004 comedy films
Films with screenplays by Trey Parker
Films produced by Trey Parker
Films with screenplays by Matt Stone
Films produced by Matt Stone
Film censorship in North Korea
Film censorship in the Czech Republic
Film controversies in North Korea
Film controversies in the Czech Republic
2000s English-language films
2000s American films